The Python Conference (also called PyCon) is the largest annual convention for the discussion and promotion of the Python programming language. It originated in the United States but is also held in more than 40 other countries. It was one of the first computer programming conferences to develop and adhere to a code of conduct. The conference hosts tutorials, demonstrations and training sessions.
 
PyCon 2020 was listed as one of "The best software engineering conferences [to attend] of 2020" and "As Python becomes ever more popular in the scientific community and for big data, the influence of PyCon will continue to grow." PyCon is often attended by Guido van Rossum (the author of the Python language). Other groups, such as PyLadies and Django Girls, often have concurrent sessions.

It is sometimes referred to in software documentation and conference papers.

It is organised by the Python Software Foundation, and is supported by many significant companies, including Microsoft, Google, and Facebook.

Location history

The canonical "PyCon" has run annually in the United States since  in Washington, D.C:

References

External links
Pycon: Connecting the Python Community – official website

Python (programming language)
Annual events
2003 establishments in Washington, D.C.
Computer conferences